Tsumori may refer to:

, Japanese fashion designer
, Japanese professional baseball 
, train station in Nishinari-ku, Osaka City, Osaka Prefecture, Japan

Japanese-language surnames